Merja is a Finnish feminine given name.

Notable persons

 Merja Halmetoja, Finnish ice hockey player
 Merja Huttunen, Finnish writer
 Merja Kinnunen, Finnish sociologist
 Merja Kiviranta, Finnish former racing cyclist
 Merja Korhonen, Finnish volleyball player
 Merja Korpela, Finnish hammer thrower
 Merja Kuusisto, Finnish politician
 Merja Kyllönen, Finnish politician
 Merja Lahtinen, Finnish cross-country skier
 Merja Larivaara, Finnish actress
 Merja Mäkisalo-Ropponen, Finnish politician
 Merja Otava, Finnish writer
 Merja Rantanen, Finnish orienteer
 Merja Raski, Finnish singer and composer
 Merja Salo, Finnish photographer and professor
 Merja Satulehto, Finnish dancer
 Merja Savolainen, Finnish footballer
 Merja Sjöman, Finnish former footballer
 Merja Annele Suvas-Berger (Meiju Suvas), Finnish singer
 Merja Tynkkynen, Finnish writer
 Merja Törrönen, Finnish former speed skater
 Merja Wirkkala, Finnish singer

References

Finnish feminine given names